Debbie Russ (born 2 August 1960 in England) is a British actress and radio presenter.

She is mainly known for playing Tiger in the UK television show Here Come the Double Deckers (1970–71), and also appeared in ITC adventure shows including The Adventurer and The Protectors.

Russ works as a newsreader on BBC World Service radio. She is also a presenter on BBC Radio 4 Extra.

References

External links
 

English child actresses
English film actresses
English television actresses
1960 births
Living people